The Penal Colony is a 1970 Chilean drama film directed by Raúl Ruiz. It is based on Franz Kafka's 1919 short story, "In the Penal Colony".

Cast
 Luis Alarcón as President
 Mónica Echeverría as Journalist
 Aníbal Reyna as Minister
 Nelson Villagra

References

External links
 

1970 films
1970 drama films
1970s Spanish-language films
Films directed by Raúl Ruiz
Chilean black-and-white films
Films based on works by Franz Kafka
Chilean drama films